HMS Blast has been the name of at least five ships of the Royal Navy:

, a 6-gun  launched in 1695, converted to a storeship in 1721, and broken up in 1724. 
, a  launched in 1740, captured by the Spanish in 1745. 
, a fire ship purchased in 1756. 
, a 8-gun  launched in 1759. 
, a 16-gun sloop purchased in 1776, converted to a fire ship in 1779 and renamed HMS Blast, and sold in 1783.

Royal Navy ship names